Hedinia is a genus of insects belonging to the family Perlodidae.

Species:
 Hedinia implexa Navás, 1936

References

Perlodidae
Plecoptera genera